Fulham Cemetery, also known as Fulham Old Cemetery and as Fulham Palace Road Cemetery, is in the London Borough of Hammersmith and Fulham, just off Fulham Palace Road. Designed by John Hall, it opened in 1865. The closest London Underground station is Barons Court.

Notable burials

 Lieutenant-General  Sir Burke Douglas Cuppage KCB (1794–1877), Lieutenant-Governor of Jersey 1863–68. 

The cemetery contains the war graves of 238 Commonwealth service personnel, 179 from World War I of whom seven are commemorated by a special memorial headstone, and 57 from World War II. Those whose graves have no headstones are listed by name on a screen wall memorial in the main war graves plot.

See also
 Fulham Road Jewish Cemetery, Jewish Cemetery on Fulham Road
 North Sheen Cemetery, also known as Fulham New Cemetery

References

External links
 Official website

1865 establishments in England
Buildings and structures in the London Borough of Hammersmith and Fulham
Cemeteries in London
Commonwealth War Graves Commission cemeteries in England
Fulham
Hammersmith and Fulham cemeteries
World War I memorials in England